The 1992 Brentwood Borough Council election took place on 7 May 1992 to elect members of Brentwood Borough Council in England.

Results summary

Ward results

Blackmore

Brentwood North

Brentwood South

Brentwood West

Brizes & Doddinghurst

Hook End & Wyatts Green

Hutton East

Hutton North

Hutton South

Ingatestone & Fryerning

Pilgrims Hatch

Shenfield

Warley

References

1992
1992 English local elections